Ezequiel Osvaldo Maderna (born October 1, 1986) is an Argentine professional boxer. He is also a former Olympian for Argentina in the men's middleweight division.

Amateur career
At the South American Games 2006 he won bronze when he lost 7:9 to Alfonso Blanco. At the second Olympic qualifier he beat three fighters including Clarence Joseph then lost to fellow-qualifier Shawn Estrada but got his ticket anyway. In Beijing he lost his rematch with Estrada in his first bout.

Pro career
On December 6, 2008 Maderna won his pro debut against veteran Guillermo Pablo Armani.

Professional boxing record 

|-
| style="text-align:center;" colspan="8"|27 Wins (16 knockouts), 6 Losses
|-  style="text-align:center; background:#e3e3e3;"
|  style="border-style:none none solid solid; "|Res.
|  style="border-style:none none solid solid; "|Record
|  style="border-style:none none solid solid; "|Opponent
|  style="border-style:none none solid solid; "|Type
|  style="border-style:none none solid solid; "|Rd.,Time
|  style="border-style:none none solid solid; "|Date
|  style="border-style:none none solid solid; "|Location
|  style="border-style:none none solid solid; "|Notes
|- align=center
|style="background:#dfd;"|Win||27–6||align=left| Karol Itauma
|
|
|
|align=left|
|align=left|
|- align=center
|Loss||26–6||align=left| Fedor Chudinov
|
|
|
|align=left|
|align=left|
|- align=center
|Loss||26–5||align=left| Jose Uzcategui
|
|
|
|align=left|
|align=left|
|- align=center
|Win||26–4||align=left| Martin Fidel Rios
|
|
|
|align=left|
|align=left|
|- align=center
|Win||25–4||align=left| Jorge Daniel Caraballo
|
|
|
|align=left|
|align=left|
|- align=center
|Loss||24–4||align=left| Martin Fidel Rios
|
|
|
|align=left|
|align=left|
|- align=center
|Win||24–3||align=left| Walter Gabriel Sequeira
|
|
|
|align=left|
|align=left|
|- align=center
|Loss||23–3||align=left| Artur Beterbiyev
|
|
|
|align=left|
|align=left|
|- align=center
|Win||23–2||align=left| Rolando Wenceslao Mansilla
|
|
|
|align=left|
|align=left|
|- align=center
|Win||22–2||align=left| Jose Alberto Clavero
|
|
|
|align=left|
|align=left|
|- align=center
|Win||21–2||align=left| Richard Vidal
|
|
|
|align=left|
|align=left|
|- align=center
|Loss||20–2||align=left| Thomas Oosthuizen
|
|
|
|align=left|
|align=left|
|- align=center
|Win||20–1||align=left| Arnaldo Alcides Benitez
|
|
|
|align=left|
|align=left|
|- align=center
|Loss||19–1||align=left| Edwin Rodriguez
|
|
|
|align=left|
|align=left|
|- align=center
|Win||19–0||align=left| Claudio Ariel Ábalos
|
|
|
|align=left|
|align=left|
|- align=center
|Win||18–0||align=left| Oscar Daniel Véliz
|
|
|
|align=left|
|align=left|
|- align=center
|Win||17–0||align=left| Ruben Eduardo Acosta
|
|
|
|align=left|
|align=left|
|- align=center
|Win||16–0||align=left| Dario German Balmaceda
|
|
|
|align=left|
|align=left|
|- align=center
|Win||15–0||align=left| Jorge Rodríguez Olivera
|
|
|
|align=left|
|align=left|
|- align=center
|Win||14–0||align=left| Martín Abel Bruer
|
|
|
|align=left|
|align=left|
|- align=center
|Win||13–0||align=left| Ruben Eduardo Acosta
|
|
|
|align=left|
|align=left|
|- align=center
|Win||12–0||align=left| Richard Emanuel Moray Martinez
|
|
|
|align=left|
|align=left|
|- align=center
|Win||11–0||align=left| Ricardo Manuel Genero
|
|
|
|align=left|
|align=left|
|- align=center
|Win||10–0||align=left| Lucas Damián Molina
|
|
|
|align=left|
|align=left|
|- align=center
|Win||9–0||align=left| Victor Hugo Peralta
|
|
|
|align=left|
|align=left|
|- align=center
|Win||8–0||align=left| Osvaldo Antonio Díaz
|
|
|
|align=left|
|align=left|
|- align=center
|Win||7–0||align=left| Crispulo Javier Andino
|
|
|
|align=left|
|align=left|
|- align=center
|Win||6–0||align=left|Ramón Argentino Guidetti
|
|
|
|align=left|
|align=left|
|- align=center
|Win||5–0||align=left| José Eduardo Martínez
|
|
|
|align=left|
|align=left|
|- align=center
|Win||4–0||align=left| Ramón Argentino Guidetti
|
|
|
|align=left|
|align=left|
|- align=center
|Win||3–0||align=left| Gabriel Arturo Ramírez
|
|
|
|align=left|
|align=left|
|- align=center
|Win||2–0||align=left| Victor Hugo Peralta
|
|
|
|align=left|
|align=left|
|- align=center
|Win||1–0||align=left| Guillermo Pablo Armani
|
|
|
|align=left|
|align=left|

References

External links
Second qualifier

Sportspeople from La Plata
Living people
Boxers at the 2008 Summer Olympics
Olympic boxers of Argentina
Middleweight boxers
1986 births
Argentine male boxers
South American Games bronze medalists for Argentina
South American Games medalists in boxing
Competitors at the 2006 South American Games